Maciej Bielecki (born 19 May 1987) is a Polish track cyclist. He was born in Białystok. He competed at the 2008 Summer Olympics in Beijing, and at the 2012 Summer Olympics in London in the men's team sprint.

References

1987 births
Living people
Sportspeople from Białystok
Polish male cyclists
Cyclists at the 2008 Summer Olympics
Cyclists at the 2012 Summer Olympics
Olympic cyclists of Poland
Polish track cyclists
European Games competitors for Poland
Cyclists at the 2019 European Games
21st-century Polish people